Starbase Indy is a science fiction convention. Its mission, revised in 2017, is "Celebrating Star Trek's vision of the future by promoting humanitarianism and STEM education today." Working to promote Gene Roddenberry's vision of a hopeful future, Starbase Indy reorganized as public benefit corporation with the purpose of raising the interest and improving the knowledge and skills of all ages in science, technology, engineering, and mathematics through engagement in public discussion, lectures, and hands-on programs during a yearly event in November. The organization also works to eliminate prejudice and discrimination through intentional inclusivity, promotion of diversity, and specifically designed activities.

Starbase Indy has also launched a related podcast, the Starbase Indy Podcast, which interviews people who are inspired by Star Trek or science fiction to work toward a hopeful future in the real world. The podcast has included actors, writers, artists, directors, scientists, academics, and researchers, many of whom have spoken at the live event in November.

Starbase Indy is held annually during the Friday through Sunday of Thanksgiving weekend in Indianapolis, Indiana. It draws attendees mainly from the Midwestern United States, but attendees have registered from as far away as Germany and Australia.

History
The idea for Starbase Indy germinated after Indianapolis Star Trek fans attended a convention in St. Louis, and decided to create their own convention. The first Starbase Indy was held in March 1988 in the Adam's Mark Hotel, and the main guest-stars were Michael Dorn, who portrayed Worf in Star Trek: The Next Generation, and Mark Lenard, who played Sarek on Star Trek: The Original Series. The convention moved to the Marriott East in Indianapolis, and the now-traditional Thanksgiving weekend. Beginning in 1989, the convention adopted "The Next Generation" as part of its name, then "The Third Generation" in 1990, and so on. With "Starbase Indy: The Eighth Generation" in 1995, the local organizing committee ended the initial run of Starbase Indy. In 2004, after a professional convention-company bowed out, a new fan-run committee organized "Starbase Indy: the Ninth Generation." In 2008 Vulkon Entertainment, which had planned to take over the convention, bowed out days before the event. Local fans put together a one-day event, known as Freekon, and later in 2009 began meeting monthly to plan the 2009 Starbase Indy convention. The local organizing-committee has continued the Thanksgiving-weekend tradition ever since. For 2011, due to the hotel schedule, the convention had to be moved to Dec. 9–11. For 2012, the convention returned to its three-day Thanksgiving-weekend tradition. In 2015, Starbase Indy returned to its original home, now known as the Wyndham Indianapolis West. In 2017, Starbase Indy began a rebranding effort, adopting a new mission statement, "Celebrating Star Trek's vision of the future by promoting humanitarianism and STEM education today." While continuing the "Geek Family Thanksgiving Tradition" convention programming, organizers are also increasing the amount of science-programming available at the convention. In 2021, the live event was back at the Indianapolis Marriott East, where it is expected to stay through 2024.

Guest stars
2022
 Bill Blair
 Sandy Gimpel
 Bonnie Gordon
 Dr. Bill Sullivan
 Jennifer Usellis
 Aaron Waltke
 Demetrius Witherspoon

2021
 Tracee Lee Cocco
 Gary Frank
 Juniper Jairala
 Boldly Go!
 Jennifer Usellis
 Geeks and Groves

2020
No event held due to pandemic

2019
 Mary Chieffo
 Tracee Lee Cocco
 Mimi Craven
 Keith DeCandido
 Chris Doohan
 Dr. Erin Macdonald

2018
 Breakfast Anytime
 Bill Blair
 Sandy Gimpel
 Francois Chau
 Five Year Mission
 Jennifer Usellis
 Dr. Erin Macdonald
 Moxie Ann Magnus
 Lawrence M. Schoen
 Carl Taliaferro
 The ShakeUps

2017
 John Billingsley
 Bonnie Friedericy
 Robert O'Reilly
 Kyle Hill
 Dr. Mohamed Noor

2016
 Sandy Gimpel
 Dominic Keating
 Chase Masterson
 Larry Nemecek
 Marc Okrand
 Garrett Wang

2015
 Jay Acovone
 Lee Arenberg
 Jeffrey Combs
 Beverley Elliott
 Eric Pierpoint 
 Natalia Nogulich
 Ona Grauer
 Chris Nowland 

2014
 Aron Eisenberg
 Lolita Fatjo 
 Max Grodénchik
 Paul McGillion 
 David Nykl
 John Paladin 
 David Reddick
 Kate Vernon
 Nana Visitor

2013
 Jay Acovone
 René Auberjonois
 Teryl Rothery
 Suzie Plakson
 Armin Shimerman
 Musetta Vander
 John Paladin 
 David Reddick

2012
 Alexis Cruz
 Nicole de Boer
 J. G. Hertzler
 Larry Nemecek
 Robert O'Reilly
 John Paladin 
 David Reddick
 Dr. David Wolf

2011
 Jay Acovone
 John Billingsley
 Bonita Friedericy
 Morgan Gendel
 Dean Haglund
 Tony Todd

2010
 Crystal Allen
 Manu Intiraymi
 Ethan Phillips
 Tim Russ
 Dr. David Wolf

2009
 Logan Huffman
 Jeff Rector
 David Reddick
 W. Morgan Shepherd W. Morgan Sheppard
 Garrett Wang

2008
 Luke Ski
 David Reddick

2007
 Ray Park
 David Reddick
 Luke Ski

2006
 Tim Brazeal
 Denise Crosby
 Alexis Cruz
 Deborah Downey 
 Gary Graham
 Jonathan Frakes
 Dean Haglund
 Mary Linda Rapelye 
 David Reddick
 Katee Sackhoff

2005
 Vaughn Armstrong
 Tim Brazeal
 Richard Coyle
 Deborah Downey 
 Aron Eisenberg
 Lolita Fatjo 
 Menina Fortunato
 Max Grodénchik
 James Horan
 Herbert Jefferson Jr.
 Dominic Keating
 Chase Masterson
 Larry Nemecek
 David Reddick

2004
 Jeffrey Combs
 Deborah Downey 
 James Horan
 Anthony Montgomery
 Connor Trinneer
 Garrett Wang

Earlier Years

Besides Michael Dorn, other guest stars at Starbase Indy have included Marina Sirtis and Majel Barrett Roddenberry in 1989; Nichelle Nichols in 1991; Leonard Nimoy in 1992; Robert Picardo and Dwight Schultz in 1995.

Convention activities

Starbase Indy is run by The Starbase, a 501c3 not for profit celebrating Star Trek's vision of the future through humanitarianism and STEM education today. The funds collected through badge sales, merchandise sales, and a silent auction support bringing more interactive, engaging, and educational activities to the annual in-person event, and paying artists and performers for their involvement. All of the organizing activities are performed by volunteers. 

Speakers at the event range from performers, creators, scientists, academics, and more. A comprehensive list of past program sessions can be found in the archived program guides available online for prior years, starting in 2018.
 /2018
 /2019
 /2021
 /2022

Starbase Indy has traditionally included the typical Q&A sessions with guest stars, a dealers’ room, panel discussions on science and science fiction topics, a masquerade, a dance, and appearances by scientists and authors. Programming in the past has included sessions on screenwriting, prop building, building robots, filk music, and meetings for Star Trek clubs.

See also
 Science fiction fandom
 List of science fiction conventions

References

External links 

Starbase Indy Podcast
Columbus Republic, What to Do Where to Go Guide

Science fiction conventions in the United States
Recurring events established in 1988
Organizations based in Indianapolis
Star Trek fandom